The Supported Accommodation Assistance Program (SAAP) is aimed at reducing homelessness in Australia. SAAP started in 1985 when Commonwealth and State/Territory funding programs were brought together. The object of the new arrangement was to grant financial assistance to the States to administer the SAAP program.  These programs were aimed to provide transitional supported accommodation and related support services, in order to help people who were homeless to achieve the maximum possible degree of self-reliance and independence.  Each of the states and territories runs a SAAP program, providing accommodation to 100,000 homeless Australians.

The SAAP programs are aimed at three levels of homeless people:
 Primary Homeless  People without conventional accommodation, living on the streets
 Secondary Homeless  People staying in boarding houses and people already in SAAP accommodation and other similar emergency accommodation services
 Tertiary Homeless  People with no secure accommodation staying temporarily with friends or relatives in private dwellings 

In 2011, the Specialist Homelessness Services (SHS) program replaced the SAAP program.

See also
 Housing Commission of Victoria
 Housing NSW
 Public housing in the Australian Capital Territory
 Homelessness in Australia

References

Welfare in Australia
Housing in Australia
Homeless shelters in Australia
Homelessness in Australia